Oxynoe is a genus of small sea snails, bubble snails, marine gastropod mollusks in the family Oxynoidae.

Species 
Species within the genus Oxynoe include 8 valid species:
 Oxynoe antillarum Mörch, 1863
 Oxynoe azuropunctata Jensen, 1980
 Oxynoe benchijigua Ortea, Moro & Espinosa, 1999
 Oxynoe delicatula Nevill & Nevill, 1869
 Oxynoe kabirensis Hamatani, 1980
 Oxynoe olivacea Rafinesque, 1814 or 1819
 Oxynoe panamensis Pilsbry & Olsson, 1943
 Oxynoe viridis (Pease, 1861)

Invalid species named Oxynoe include:
 Oxynoe aguayoi Jaume, 1945
 Oxynoe brachycephalus Mörch, 1863
 Oxynoe glabra Couthouy, 1838 : synonym of Marsenina glabra (Couthouy, 1838)
 Oxynoe hargravesi Adams, 1872
 Oxynoe natalensis Smith, 1903

References

Oxynoidae
Taxa named by Constantine Samuel Rafinesque